Hewes Point is a peninsula in Islesboro, Maine. It is located on Penobscot Bay.

It was named for Paola Hewes, a pioneer settler.

References

Landforms of Waldo County, Maine